In enzymology, a 2-oxobutyrate synthase is an enzyme that catalyzes the chemical reaction

2-oxobutanoate + CoA + oxidized ferredoxin  propanoyl-CoA + CO2 + reduced ferredoxin

The 3 substrates of this enzyme are 2-oxobutanoate, CoA, and oxidized ferredoxin, whereas its 3 products are propanoyl-CoA, CO2, and reduced ferredoxin.

This enzyme belongs to the family of oxidoreductases, specifically those acting on the aldehyde or oxo group of donor with an iron-sulfur protein as acceptor.  The systematic name of this enzyme class is 2-oxobutanoate:ferredoxin 2-oxidoreductase (CoA-propanoylating). Other names in common use include alpha-ketobutyrate-ferredoxin oxidoreductase, 2-ketobutyrate synthase, alpha-ketobutyrate synthase, 2-oxobutyrate-ferredoxin oxidoreductase, and 2-oxobutanoate:ferredoxin 2-oxidoreductase (CoA-propionylating).  This enzyme participates in propanoate metabolism.

References 

 

EC 1.2.7
Enzymes of unknown structure